, formerly , is the first child of Takahito, Prince Mikasa, and Yuriko, Princess Mikasa. She married Tadateru Konoe on 16 December 1966. As a result, she gave up her imperial title and left the Japanese Imperial Family, as required by law.

Education

Yasuko was born at Numazu Imperial Villa, Numazu, In her childhood, Konoe attended Gakushuin Elementary School and then Gakushuin Women's Secondary School. She later completed her studies by graduating from the Department of Japanese Language and Literature, Faculty of Letters, Gakushuin University.

Marriage and family

Princess Yasuko married Tadateru Konoe on 16 December 1966. Upon her marriage, she left the Imperial House of Japan and took the surname of her husband. Tadateru Konoe is the younger brother of former Prime Minister Morihiro Hosokawa and adopted grandson (and heir) of former Prime Minister Fumimaro Konoe. He is currently President of the Japanese Red Cross Society. They have a son named, Tadahiro (born 18 July 1970). Through Tadahiro and his wife, Keiko Kuni (m. 10 April 2004), Konoe has three grandchildren: two boys and one girl.

Titles and styles

 26 April 1944 – 16 December 1966: Her Imperial Highness Princess Yasuko
 16 December 1966 – present: Mrs. Tadateru Konoe

Honours

National honours
 Grand Cordon of the Order of the Precious Crown

Ancestry

References

1944 births
Living people
Japanese princesses
People from Tokyo
Gakushuin University alumni

Grand Cordons (Imperial Family) of the Order of the Precious Crown